André Berthomieu (16 February 1903 – 10 April 1960) was a French screenwriter and film director. He was married to the actress Line Noro.

Selected filmography
Director
 Not So Stupid (1928)
 The Crime of Sylvestre Bonnard (1929)
 The Ladies in the Green Hats (1929)
 My Friend Victor (1931)
 Mademoiselle Josette, My Woman (1933)
  (1934)
 The Secret of Polichinelle (1936)
 The Flame (1936)
 The Lover of Madame Vidal (1936)
 Death on the Run (1936)
 Chaste Susanne (1937)
 The Girl in the Taxi (1937)
 The Train for Venice (1938)
 The Woman of Monte Carlo (1938)
 The Angel of the Night (1944)
 Resistance (1945)
 My First Love (1945)
 Not So Stupid (1946)
 Gringalet (1946)
 The Heart on the Sleeve (1948)
 The Chocolate Girl (1950)
 Mademoiselle Josette, My Woman (1950)
 His Father's Portrait (1953)
 Wonderful Mentality (1953)
 The Last Robin Hood (1953)
 Scènes de ménage (1954)
 Four Days in Paris (1955)
 Love in Jamaica (1957)
 Préméditation (1960)

External links

1903 births
1960 deaths
Film people from Rouen
French film directors